Sheikh Hamad bin Suhaim bin Hamad bin Abdullah bin Jassim bin Muhammed Al Thani (born 1958 in Doha), is a former government minister of Qatar. He is the son of Sheikh Suhaim bin Hamad Al Thani, the granduncle (and father-in-law, through the current Emir's first marriage to Hamad's daughter Sheikha Jawaher bint Hamad bin Suhaim Al Thani) of the current Emir of Qatar, Tamim bin Hamad Al Thani.

Biography 
He studied at the Royal Military Academy Sandhurst.

He was deputy of Foreign Affairs Minister (1986-1989).
He was Minister of Information and Culture (1989–1992) then Minister of Public Health (1992–1995)
He was the Palace Affairs Minister (1995–1996).

He became Minister of State Without Portfolio (1996–present).

In August 2020, Sheikh Hamad was elected as the new president of Qatar SC.

Family
Sheikh Hamad is married to five wives:

Among his daughters are:
Sheikha Jawaher bint Hamad, married her second cousin, the current Emir of Qatar, Sheikh Tamim Bin Hamad Al Thani, has two daughters - Almayassa and Aisha, and two sons - Hamad and Jassim.
Sheikha Mashael bint Hamad, married Sheikh Nasser bin Ali Ahmed bin Khalifa Al Thani, has two daughters and one son.
Sheikha Noof bint Hamad, married to Sheikh Ahmed bin Hamad Al Thani, has one son.
Sheikha Aldana bint Hamad, married to Sheikh Mohammed bin Faisal bin Qassim Al Thani, has two sons.

References

1958 births
Living people
Hamad Bin Suhaim
Government ministers of Qatar